Çela is an Albanian surname. Notable people with the surname include:
 Emiliano Çela (born 1985), Albanian footballer
 Gentian Çela (born 1981), Albanian footballer
 Isuf Çela (born 1996), Albanian footballer
 Joan Çela (born 2000), Albanian footballer
 Klaidi Cela (born 1999), Canadian soccer player
 Sokol Çela (born 1988), Albanian footballer

Albanian-language surnames